"Drive Me Wild" is a song written by Mark Miller, Gregg Hubbard and Mike Lawler, and recorded by American country music group Sawyer Brown.  It was released in November 1998 as the first single and title track from the album Drive Me Wild.  The song reached number 6 on the Billboard Hot Country Singles & Tracks chart. This was the band's last top 10 hit.

Chart performance
"Drive Me Wild" debuted at number 65 on the U.S. Billboard Hot Country Singles & Tracks for the week of November 14, 1998.

Year-end charts

References

1998 singles
1998 songs
Sawyer Brown songs
Songs written by Mark Miller (musician)
Music videos directed by Michael Salomon
Curb Records singles